Bam Bam may refer to:

People
 Bam Bam (nickname)
 Bamm-Bamm Rubble, sometimes spelled Bam-Bam, a character on the 1960s animated television show The Flintstones
 Bam Bam (radio presenter) (born 1970), UK personality
 Bam Bam (wrestler) (born 1985), Mexican professional wrestler 
 Bam Bam Bigelow (1961–2007), American professional wrestler
 BamBam (born 1997), Thai singer
 Terry Gordy (1961–2001), American professional wrestler
 Tai Tuivasa (born 1993), Australian rugby league player turned mixed martial artist of Samoan descent

Music 
Bam Bam (band), American pop band created by Chris Westbrook
Bam Bam, Seattle band founded by Tina Bell in 1983
 "Bam Bam" (Sister Nancy song), 1982
 "Bam Bam" (Camila Cabello song), 2022
 "Bam bam" (Kim Kay song), 1999
 "Bam Bam", a 2011 song by King Charles (musician)
 "Bam Bam", a 1966 song by The Maytals
 "Bambam", a 2019 single by Ängie

Other uses
 Bambam language, a language spoken in Indonesia

See also 
 Bang Bang (disambiguation)